Governor Wise may refer to:

Bob Wise, 33rd Governor of West Virginia
Henry A. Wise, 33rd Governor of Virginia